Edmondson-Westside High School is a public high school located in the southwest area known as Edmondson Village of Baltimore, Maryland, United States. The school is made up of two buildings, the Edmondson Building (located on Athol Avenue) which is used primarily for Academic Studies, and the Westside Building (located on Edmondson Avenue/U.S. Route 40) which is used for Vocational and Technical Studies such as Culinary Arts, Child Care, Automotive, Media Technology, Computer Programming and Nursing. The Edmondson High building opened in September 1955, originally as Edmondson High School, a co-educational neighborhood comprehensive high school. The Westside Building several city blocks away, known originally as the Westside Skills Center, an independent separate school within the BCPS system, opened up in September 1980 to expand the high school, adding the former closed suburban branch of a local department store. At a later date the two schools were merged to form Edmondson-Westside (EWHS).

Sports

Edmondson's Redstorm (formerly known as Redskins) hold many athletic championships around the city. In the 2006–2007 academic year, their varsity football team were the 2A State Champions and the varsity wrestling team were the city champions.

The old Edmondson High School "Red Skins" teams of the 1960s dominated the Maryland high school sports scene with the football team being the undefeated state champions in the 'A' Conference of the old public-private league Maryland Scholastic Association (existed 1919–1992) from 1963 to 1968.

Graduates of those teams won scholarships to many prestigious schools such as the U.S. Naval Academy at Annapolis, U.S. Military Academy at West Point,  and at The Pennsylvania State University (Penn State).

While the football team enjoyed their undefeated win streak, other sports such as basketball and swimming won State championship after championship.

Edmondson's lacrosse program under the direction of Augie Waibel and Lon Russ, fielded one of the first integrated high school Lacrosse teams in the nation. The teams received many honors and many of the black youth were recruited to play at the college level where they did well.

The class of 2005 was the last to graduate that had used the Redskins as the school mascot. That class is often nicknamed "The Last of the Redskins."

Notable alumni
Emory Elliott, Ph.D., Distinguished Professor, University of California, Riverside
Stanton Kidd (born 1992), basketball player for Hapoel Jerusalem in  the Israeli Basketball Premier League
John Miller, Baltimore Orioles pitcher
Nathaniel T. Oaks, member Maryland House of Delegates, 41st district
Charlie Pittman, former NFL running back
Warren Powers, former NFL defensive end, Denver Broncos
Marvin Webster, former NBA player

References

External links
 
 Edmondson-Westside High School - Maryland Report Card
 Edmondson-Westside High School at Explore Baltimore Heritage

Public schools in Baltimore
Public high schools in Maryland
Middle States Commission on Secondary Schools
Magnet schools in Maryland
Educational institutions established in 1955
1955 establishments in Maryland